Valeri Viktorovich Kamenski (born 18 April 1966) is a Russian former professional ice hockey player.

Playing career
Before the National Hockey League (NHL), he started his career with Khimik Voskresensk in the Soviet Championship League (1982–1985) and then played for the powerhouse club CSKA Moscow (1985–1991). In 1991 he moved to the NHL, where he played for the Quebec Nordiques (1991–1995, spending the 1994 lockout break in HC Ambri-Piotta, Switzerland), Colorado Avalanche (1995–1999), New York Rangers (1999–2001), Dallas Stars and New Jersey Devils (2001–2002). He won a Stanley Cup in 1996 with the Avalanche.

He is also known for scoring one of the most memorable goals of the 97/98 season. He received a pass and scored while spinning in mid-air. The goal was used in the opening intro for the NHL 98 video game. He also scored the first goal in the Avalanche's history in Denver since the relocation from Quebec City.

Career statistics

Regular season and playoffs

International

Awards
 1985–86: Gold medal, CSKA Moscow (Soviet Championship League).
 1986: Gold medal (Ice Hockey World Championships).
 1986–87: Gold medal, CSKA Moscow (Soviet Championship League).
 1988: Gold medal (XV Olympic Winter Games).
 1987–88: Gold medal, CSKA Moscow (Soviet Championship League).
 1987–88: Gold medal, CSKA Moscow (USSR Cup).
 1989: Gold medal (Ice Hockey World Championships).
 1988–89: Gold medal, CSKA Moscow (Soviet Championship League).
 1990: Gold medal (Ice Hockey World Championships).
 1995–96: Stanley Cup, Colorado Avalanche (NHL)
 1998: Silver medal (XVIII Olympic Winter Games).
 2004-05: Faith Towards Hockey Award

References

External links

Valery Kamensky at Hockey CCCP International

1966 births
Living people
Colorado Avalanche players
Dallas Stars players
HC Ambrì-Piotta players
HC CSKA Moscow players
HC Khimik Voskresensk players
Ice hockey players at the 1988 Winter Olympics
Ice hockey players at the 1998 Winter Olympics
Medalists at the 1998 Winter Olympics
National Hockey League All-Stars
New Jersey Devils players
New York Rangers players
Olympic gold medalists for the Soviet Union
Olympic ice hockey players of Russia
Olympic ice hockey players of the Soviet Union
Olympic medalists in ice hockey
Olympic silver medalists for Russia
People from Voskresensk
Quebec Nordiques draft picks
Quebec Nordiques players
Russian ice hockey left wingers
Soviet ice hockey left wingers
Triple Gold Club
Medalists at the 1988 Winter Olympics
IIHF Hall of Fame inductees
Sportspeople from Moscow Oblast
Russian expatriate ice hockey people
Russian expatriate sportspeople in the United States
Russian expatriate sportspeople in Canada
Russian expatriate sportspeople in Switzerland
Expatriate ice hockey players in the United States
Expatriate ice hockey players in Canada
Expatriate ice hockey players in Switzerland